Baczków may refer to:

Baczków, Lesser Poland Voivodeship, a village in the administrative district of Gmina Bochnia, Bochnia County, Poland
Baczków, Lublin Voivodeship, a village in the administrative district of Gmina Wola Mysłowska, Łuków County, Poland

See also
Bačkov (disambiguation)